Penthema lisarda, the yellow kaiser, is a species of satyrine butterfly found along the Himalayas and in Indochina.

Subspecies
Penthema lisarda lisarda (Sikkim, Assam and possibly Bhutan)
Penthema lisarda mihintala Fruhstorfer (Burma: Chin Hills)
Penthema lisarda michallati Janet, 1894 (Indo China and possibly Hainan)

References

Satyrinae
Butterflies of Indochina